Alien Breed 3D is a first-person shooter, the fourth game in Team17's Alien Breed franchise, a series of science fiction-themed shooters. It was published in 1995 by Ocean Software. It was followed by a sequel, Alien Breed 3D II: The Killing Grounds, in 1996.

Plot
Osiris III's commanding officer, Captain J.T. Reynolds contacts Earth Defense Force General R.E. Grant reporting how the secret Project Osiris has slipped out of scientists' hands: attempts have been made to cultivate the alien eggs found in Azirin by cloning them and combining with human DNA, leading to remarkable results, but due to system failures, the Breed has been unleashed and killed people at the research station. In the message, Reynolds announces that he has found weapons and other supplies in a decommissioned observatory and plans to return to the base to find an escape route from the planet and possibly destroy the Breed's source in the meantime before his own oxygen supplies dwindle.

Gameplay
Alien Breed 3D is a first-person shooter. The game has maps of varying depths with platforms and floors above others, something the Doom engine was not capable of.

Development
Team17 released the source codes for Alien Breed 3D and its sequel, Alien Breed 3D II: The Killing Grounds, for personal use on the March 1997 cover CD of Amiga Format.

Reception

Alien Breed 3D was released to critical acclaim among the Amiga gaming press. Reviewers widely compared its gameplay to Doom, with some calling it the best Doom-clone for Amiga.

The game was ranked the 12th best game of all time by Amiga Power. It reappeared as one of the 25 games compiled for the A500 Mini console, released in 2022.

References 

1995 video games
Alien Breed
Amiga games
Amiga 1200 games
Amiga-only games
Amiga CD32 games
Commercial video games with freely available source code
Cooperative video games
First-person shooters
Multiplayer and single-player video games
Multiplayer null modem games
Ocean Software games
Science fiction video games
Sprite-based first-person shooters
Video games scored by Bjørn Lynne
Video games developed in the United Kingdom